Dennis Higgins (1915 – 25 September 1942) was an English footballer who played as a forward for Tamworth and Fulham. He was killed in action in World War II.

Early life
Higgins was born at Wolstanton, Staffordshire, son of Michael Joseph Higgins and his wife Mary Jane.

Career
Higgins played for Tamworth and Fulham. During World War II he appeared as a guest for Port Vale from September 1939 to May 1940, when he was conscripted into the army.

War service and death
Higgins, who served as a private in the 9th battalion Durham Light Infantry, was killed in action in British-occupied Egypt on 25 September 1942, age recordedly 26. He left a widow, Nancy, living in Leek, Staffordshire. Having no known grave, he is commemorated on the Alamein Memorial.

Career statistics
Source:

See also
 List of footballers killed during World War II

References

1915 births
1942 deaths
Military personnel from Staffordshire
People from Wolstanton
English footballers
Association football forwards
Tamworth F.C. players
Fulham F.C. players
Port Vale F.C. wartime guest players
English Football League players
Durham Light Infantry soldiers
British Army personnel killed in World War II